The 1991–92 St. Louis Blues season saw the Blues finish in third place in the Norris Division with a record of 36 wins, 33 losses, and 11 ties for 83 points. They lost the Division Semi-finals in six games to the Chicago Blackhawks.

Among the highlights of the season was the trade of Adam Oates and Brett Hull's third consecutive season with 70 goals, which is an NHL record.

Off-season
Team captain Scott Stevens is taken by the New Jersey Devils, via arbitration ruling. Defenceman Garth Butcher is named team captain.

NHL Draft

Regular season

Final standings

Schedule and results

Playoffs

Player statistics

Regular season
Scoring

Goaltending

Playoffs
Scoring

Goaltending

References
 Blues on Hockey Database

St.
St.
St. Louis Blues seasons
St
St